Standing Bear  (c. 1829–1908) was a Ponca Native American chief.

Standing Bear may also refer to:

Places
 Chief Standing Bear Memorial Bridge, a bridge across the Missouri River at the Nebraska-South Dakota border, named after the Ponca chief
 Standing Bear Lake, West Omaha, Nebraska, a park and reservoir named after the Ponca chief

People
 Luther Standing Bear (1868–1939), Oglala Lakota Native American author, educator, philosopher and Hollywood actor
 Henry Standing Bear (c. 1874–1953), Oglala Lakota Native American chief who commissioned sculptor Korczak Ziolkowski to build the Crazy Horse Memorial

Fictional characters
 Henry Standing Bear, a character in the TV series Longmire, played by Lou Diamond Phillips
 Jon Standing Bear, one of several DC Comics characters named Super-Chief